Latvian orthography historically used a system based upon German phonetic principles, while the Latgalian dialect was written using Polish orthographic principles. The present-day Latvian orthography was developed by the Knowledge Commission of the Riga Latvian Association in 1908, and was approved the same year by the orthography commission under the leadership of Kārlis Mīlenbahs and Jānis Endzelīns. Its basis is the Latin script and it was introduced by law from 1920 to 1922 in the Republic of Latvia. For the most part it is phonetic in that it follows the pronunciation of the language.

Alphabet
Today, the Latvian standard alphabet consists of 33 letters.

The modern standard Latvian alphabet uses 22 unmodified letters of the Latin alphabet. The Latvian alphabet lacks Q, W, X and Y. These letters are not used in Latvian for writing foreign personal and geographical names; instead they are adapted to Latvian phonology, orthography, and morphology, e. g. Džordžs Volkers Bušs (George Walker Bush). However, these four letters can be used in mathematics and sometimes in brand names: their names are kū, dubultvē, iks and igrek. The Latvian alphabet has a further eleven letters formed by adding diacritic marks to some letters. The vowel letters A, E, I and U can take a macron to show length, unmodified letters being short. These letters are collated as plain A, E, I, U. The letters C, S and Z, which in unmodified form are pronounced ,  and  respectively, can be marked with a caron. These marked letters, Č, Š and Ž are pronounced ,  and  respectively. The letters Ģ, Ķ, Ļ and Ņ are written with a cedilla or a small comma placed below (or, in the case of the lowercase g, above). These are collated separately from their unmodified counterparts. The Latgalian language (variously considered a separate language or a dialect of Latvian) adds two extra letters to this standard set: Ō and Y.

The letters F and H appear only in loanwords. However, they are common enough in modern Latvian, more common than Ž, Ģ, Ķ, or Č.

Historically the letters CH, Ō and Ŗ were also used in the Latvian alphabet. The last of these stood for the palatalized dental trill  which is still used in some dialects (mainly outside Latvia) but not in the standard language, and hence the letter Ŗ was finally removed from the alphabet on 5 June 1946, when the Latvian SSR legislature passed a regulation that officially replaced it with R in print. A spelling reform replacing Ŗ with R, CH with H, and Ō with O, was enacted in 1938, but then Ŗ and CH were reinstated in 1939, Ō was reinstated in 1940, Ŗ and Ō were finally removed in 1946 and CH was finally removed in 1957. 

The letters CH, Ō and Ŗ continue to be used in print throughout most of the Latvian diaspora communities, whose founding members left their homeland before the post-World War II Soviet-era language reforms. An example of a publication in Latvia today, albeit one aimed at the Latvian diaspora, that uses the older orthography—including the letters CH, Ō and Ŗ—is the weekly newspaper Brīvā Latvija.

Sound–spelling correspondences

Latvian has a phonetic spelling. There are only a few exceptions to this:

 The letter E and its long variation Ē, which are used to write two sounds that represent the short and long versions of either  or  respectively: ēdu (I ate) vs. ēdu (I eat) and dzer (2sg, you drink) vs. dzer (3sg, s/he drinks)
 The letter O indicates both the short and long , and the diphthong . These three sounds are written as O, Ō and Uo in Latgalian, and some Latvians campaign for the adoption of this system in standard Latvian. However, the majority of Latvian linguists argue that o and ō are found only in loanwords, with the Uo sound being the only native Latvian phoneme. The digraph Uo was discarded in 1914, and the letter Ō has not been used in the standard orthography since 1946. Example: robots [o] (a robot, noun) vs. robots [uo] (toothed; adjective); tols [o] (tolite; noun) vs tols [uo] (hornless; adjective).
 Also, Latvian orthography does not distinguish intonation homographs: sējums [ē] (crops) vs sējums [è] (book edition), tā (that, feminine) vs tā (this way, adverb).
 Positional sound changes are not indicated in writing. These include: consonant assimilation (bs>ps, cd>dzd, sč>šč, etc.), simplifying word-final consonant clusters (ts>c, šs>š), pronouncing word-final or pre-consonantal combinations "vowel+'j'" and "vowel+'v'" as diphthongs (aj>ai, av>au), prolonging voiceless obstruents between vowels (apa>appa). In these cases, the spelling of morphemes remains the same as in other environments: labs 'good', piecdesmit 'fifty', pusčetri 'half past three', svešs 'strange', tavs 'your', lapa 'leaf'.

Latvian orthography also uses digraphs Dz, Dž and Ie.

Old orthography

The old orthography was based on that of German and did not represent the Latvian language phonemically. At the beginning it was used to write religious texts for German priests to help them in their work with Latvians. The first writings in Latvian were chaotic: there were as many as twelve variations of writing Š. In 1631 the German priest Georg Mancelius tried to systematize the writing. He wrote long vowels according to their position in the word — a short vowel followed by h for a radical vowel, a short vowel in the suffix and vowel with a diacritic mark in the ending indicating two different accents. Consonants were written following the example of German with multiple letters. The old orthography was used until the 20th century when it was slowly replaced by the modern orthography.

Computer encoding
Lack of software support of diacritics has caused an unofficial style of orthography, often called translit, to emerge for use in situations when the user is unable to access Latvian diacritic marks on the computer or using cell phone. It uses only letters of the ISO basic Latin alphabet, and letters not used in standard orthography are usually omitted. In this style, diacritics are replaced by digraphs:

ā, ē, ī, ū - aa, ee, ii, uu
ļ, ņ, ģ, ķ - lj, nj, gj, kj
š - sh (as well as ss, sj, etc.)

Some people may find it difficult to use such methods and either write without any indication of missing diacritic marks or use digraphs only if the diacritic mark in question would make a semantic difference. There is yet another style, sometimes called "Pokémonism" (In Latvian Internet slang "Pokémon" is derogatory for adolescent), characterised by use of some elements of leet, use of non-Latvian letters (particularly w and x instead of v and ks), use of c instead of ts, use of z in endings, and use of mixed case.

The IETF language tags have registered a subtag for the old orthography (for Fraktur)

Keyboard 

Standard QWERTY keyboards are used for writing in Latvian; diacritics are entered by using a dead key (usually ', occasionally ~). Some keyboard layouts use a modifier key AltGr (most notable of such is the Windows 2000 and XP built-in layout (Latvian QWERTY)). In the early 1990s, the Latvian ergonomic keyboard layout was developed. Although this layout may be available with language support software, it has not become popular because of a lack of keyboards with such a configuration.

References 

Latvian language
Indo-European Latin-script orthographies
Keyboard layouts